Platensina euryptera is a species of tephritid or fruit flies in the genus Platensina of the family Tephritidae.

Distribution
Myanmar, Thailand, Indonesia.

References

Tephritinae
Insects described in 1913
Taxa named by Mario Bezzi
Diptera of Asia